B.J. and the Bear is an American action comedy television series which aired on NBC from February 10, 1979, to May 9, 1981. Created by Glen A. Larson and Christopher Crowe, the series stars Greg Evigan. The series was produced when the CB radio and trucking craze had peaked in the United States, following the 1974–1976 television series Movin' On, the number one song "Convoy" (1975) by C. W. McCall, as well as the films White Line Fever (1975), Smokey and the Bandit (1977), Convoy (1978), and Every Which Way but Loose (1978).

The theme song, also titled "B.J. and the Bear", was written by Glen Larson and performed by Greg Evigan.

Premise and storylines
Greg Evigan stars as Billie Joe "B.J." McKay, a professional freelance itinerant trucker who travels the country's highways in a red and white Kenworth K-100 Aerodyne (a COE semi truck) with his pet chimpanzee Bear (named after Bear Bryant, the famed football coach for the University of Alabama). In the pilot movie, it is stated that he had spent two years in Vietnam as a medical helicopter pilot, had been a captain and earned the Distinguished Service Cross. He was a prisoner of war in North Vietnam at the Hanoi Hilton for four months in 1973 after his helicopter went down over the DMZ. Episodes typically deal with B.J. uncovering or getting mixed up with crime in the area he's traveling through, and a local resident — usually, a young, beautiful woman — appealing to him for help.

A frequent guest star in the first season is Sheriff Elroy P. Lobo (Claude Akins, who previously starred in the trucking series Movin' On), whose character eventually spun off onto his own show The Misadventures of Sheriff Lobo along with guest character "Waverly" Ben Cooper.

Two episodes in season two, "Eyes Of Texas" (1979) and "The Girls On The Hollywood High" (1980), were designed as prospective pilots for a series about a pair of private detectives called Heather Fern (Rebecca Reynolds) and Caroline Capodi (Lorrie Mahaffey in the first one, Heather Thomas in the second). The latter episode has cameo appearances from John S. Ragin and Robert Ito as their characters from Quincy, M.E. (also a Glen A. Larson series).

In 1981, when the show returned for its third season with the two-part episode "B.J. and the Seven Lady Truckers" (not to be confused with the season two opener "Snow White and the Seven Lady Truckers", also a two-parter), B.J. has settled down to run Bear Enterprises, a trucking company based in Los Angeles. His nemesis is Rutherford T. Grant (Murray Hamilton), the corrupt head of the state's Special Crimes Action Team, who is a secret partner in a competing trucking company. Because of Grant's harassment, B.J. is unable to hire experienced truckers, and is forced to hire seven beautiful young female truckers, consisting of Grant's daughter Cindy (Sherilyn Wolter), twins Teri and Geri (Candi and Randi Brough), no-nonsense Angie (Sheila Wills), Samantha (Amanda Horan Kennedy), Callie (Linda McCullough), and a busty blonde nicknamed "Stacks" (Judy Landers), along with a female dispatcher, Stacy (Susan Woolen).

Though Universal has not yet released BJ and the Bear on home video, bootleg editions are available on DVD.

Episodes

Pilot (1978)

Season 1 (1979)

Season 2 (1979–80)

Season 3 (1981)

References

External links
  (Pilot)
 
 

1979 American television series debuts
1981 American television series endings
1970s American comedy television series
1980s American comedy television series
American action comedy television series
Citizens band radio in popular culture
English-language television shows
Fictional duos
Kenworth
NBC original programming
Television series by Universal Television
Television shows set in Los Angeles
Trucking industry in the United States
Television series created by Christopher Crowe (screenwriter)
Television series created by Glen A. Larson
Television shows about chimpanzees